"The Sacred Taking" is the eighth episode of the third season of the anthology television series American Horror Story, which premiered on December 4, 2013, on the cable network FX. The episode was written by Ryan Murphy and directed by Alfonso Gomez-Rejon.

In this episode, Fiona (Jessica Lange) must take her life in order to undertake a ritual to find the next Supreme. This episode is rated TV-MA (LV). Angela Bassett, Gabourey Sidibe, Danny Huston, and Patti LuPone guest star as Marie Laveau, Queenie, the Axeman, and Joan Ramsey, respectively.

Plot
After an encounter with Queenie under an overpass, Zoe and Madison are summoned by Cordelia to plot against Fiona. During the plan, however, a scared Misty appears at the front door, revealing she seeks protection from a witch hunter. She reveals Myrtle - who is now almost fully healed - is with her, who determines that Misty's resurrection abilities mean she is in fact the next Supreme.

Luke's mother - Joan - chastises him for visiting the girls at the Academy, making him an enema, and forcing him to strip. At the Academy, Nan hears his screams and wants to help him, but Cordelia wants her assistance in the plot against Fiona. The Coven prepares for the Sacred Taking: a ritual that is invoked to protect the Coven in which the current Supreme takes her own life to ensure the safety of the Coven. Misty is resistant to becoming the next Supreme, though Cordelia assures her no one gets to choose.

Fiona - whose health is deteriorating quickly as a result of one of the younger witches obtaining her Supreme powers - discovers Madison in her room, who lies that she is the next Supreme before giving Fiona pills to take her own life. Myrtle appears thereafter, convincing Fiona to do so by casting an illusion over Fiona. Fiona takes the pills and lies in her bed, asking that Myrtle take care of Cordelia. However, she later sees Spalding, who scolds her for taking the "coward's way out" before telling her the Coven lied to her. Fiona vomits the pills and vows revenge on Spalding's life and her own.

Meanwhile, Queenie discretely brings food to an imprisoned Delphine, who begs for release. Marie Laveau arrives and taunts Delphine, who remains proud until Marie Laveau chops off her hand.

Nan falls out with Zoe and Madison over their belief that she is not the next Supreme, storming off to pay a visit to Luke. Joan discovers the two of them but is soon shot by a rifle, followed by Luke (who was attempting to protect Nan). Misty appears and Fiona - having surprised the Coven that she is still alive - follows after her, under the belief that Misty is the next Supreme. Fiona challenges Misty to bring Joan back to life, which she does before collapsing. Zoe warns Kyle that the Coven is under attack. Kyle professes his love for Zoe while a distraught Madison listens on.

The next morning, Fiona reveals to Cordelia she in fact admires her daughter's attempt to kill her. A package arrives at the Coven, which Fiona opens to discover Delphine's decapitated head, gasping for help.

Reception
Rotten Tomatoes reports an 81% approval rating, based on 16 reviews. The critical consensus reads, "The polished writing and creative direction turn "The Sacred Taking" into a more-than watchable transitional episode, speckled with touching, human moments." Emily VanDerWerff of The A.V. Club gave the episode a B rating, saying, ""The Sacred Taking" is just good enough to make me realize how much this season has been lacking, in ways both major and minor." Matt Fowler from IGN gave the episode a 7.6/10 rating, writing, "Coven is still wickedly watchable, but it does run in circles. Even more so than Asylum."

"The Sacred Taking" received a 2.2 18–49 ratings share and was watched by 4.07 million viewers in its original American broadcast, winning the night for cable.

References

External links

 
 "The Sacred Taking" at TV Guide.com

2013 American television episodes
American Horror Story: Coven episodes
Television episodes written by Ryan Murphy (writer)